Out of the Abyss is the seventh studio album released by the American heavy metal band Manilla Road. It was first issued in 1988 on Leviathan Records, then re-released in 2005 on Cult Metal Classics. Though the band had been constantly increasing the thrash metal influence to their music since their album Open the Gates, this album was its peak, being almost completely thrash metal.

Track listing

 "Whitechapel" – 7:16
 "Rites of Blood" – 4:18
 "Out of the Abyss" – 3:25
 "Return of the Old Ones" – 6:22
 "Black Cauldron" – 2:57
 "Midnight Meat Train" – 3:00
 "War in Heaven" – 4:58
 "Slaughterhouse" – 3:40
 "Helicon" – 6:39

Credits
Manilla Road
 Mark Shelton – Lead vocals, guitar
 Scott Park – bass Guitar
 Randy Foxe – drums and percussion, backing vocals

Additional personal
Mike Curtis - chimes

Production
mixed at Prairie Sun Studios
Manilla Road, Max Merhoff - producers
Steve Fontano - mixing
Max Merhoff - co-producer
David T. Chastain - executive producer
Aaron Brown - artwork
mastered at Fantasy Studios
Manilla Road albums
1988 albums